Marko Ranđelović (Serbian Cyrillic: Марко Ранђеловић; born 16 August 1984) is a Serbian professional footballer who plays as a defender for Budućnost Popovac.

During his career, Ranđelović played for Radnički Niš and Rad in his country, as well as for Kazakhstani club Taraz, Bulgarian clubs Lokomotiv Sofia and Neftochimic Burgas and Macedonian club Bregalnica Štip.

References

External links
 
 

1984 births
Living people
Serbian footballers
Association football defenders
Serbian SuperLiga players
First Professional Football League (Bulgaria) players
Kazakhstan Premier League players
Expatriate footballers in Bulgaria
Expatriate footballers in Kazakhstan
Serbian expatriate sportspeople in Bulgaria
Serbian expatriate sportspeople in Kazakhstan
FC Taraz players
FK Čukarički players
FK Rad players
FK Radnički Niš players
FC Lokomotiv 1929 Sofia players
Neftochimic Burgas players
FK Bregalnica Štip players
Serbian expatriate footballers
Sportspeople from Niš